Ellingham is a civil parish in Northumberland, England. The population taken at the 2001 Census was 282, increasing slightly to 288 at the 2011 Census.

References

External links 

 
GENUKI (Accessed: 24 November 2008)

Villages in Northumberland
Civil parishes in Northumberland